Jan T. Kleyna  is a postdoctoral astronomy researcher at the University of Hawaiʻi Institute for Astronomy. His area of interest is galaxy dynamics, and he has worked to develop codes for the real-time detection of moving objects such as Jovian satellites.  He has also co-discovered several of Saturn's moons.

References

Living people
Year of birth missing (living people)
21st-century British astronomers